Archibald Donald Mackenzie (22 October 1914 - 6 October 1944), or Donny Mackenzie, was a captain of the 2nd Battalion the Queen's Own Cameron Highlanders, best known for escaping from a prisoner of war (PoW) camp near Piacenza in northern Italy; joining and serving as second-in-command of an Italian partisan force in Piacenza province, the Brigata Stella Rossa which in the course of 1944 liberated the valley of the Nure; and in the course of this also assisting other Allied prisoners (at least 126 airmen) to make their way to Switzerland. He was shot by a German patrol on 6 October 1944, immediately after taking the surrender of the Fascist garrison at Ponte dell'Olio.

Born on 22 October 1914, the son of Captain Lynedoch Archibald Mackenzie and Dorothy Yates, he was educated in Winchester College from 1928-1933. He then went to Christ Church, Oxford in October 1933 with a Kitchener Scholarship, to read Classics. In 1936 he was granted a commission in the Queen’s Own Cameron Highlanders. 

After the war, Mackenzie’s body was moved by the Commonwealth War Graves Commission to grave III.A.5 of the Staglieno War Cemetery, Genoa. There are also memorials to him in Bettola, Alberola, and the Dean Cemetery in Edinburgh.

References

Bibliography

People educated at Winchester College
Alumni of Christ Church, Oxford
Queen's Own Cameron Highlanders officers
British Army personnel killed in World War II
British escapees
British World War II prisoners of war